Pavel Olenev (1898 – 1964) was a Soviet and Russian film actor.

He died on January 19, 1964, in Moscow, RSFSR, USSR, and was buried at the Vagankovo Cemetery.

Filmography

References

External links
 

1898 births
1964 deaths
Burials at Vagankovo Cemetery
Soviet male actors
Honored Artists of the RSFSR